After the October Revolution, in which the Bolsheviks seized power in Russia, the first Socialist Orders of Merit were founded. After World War II, communists came to power in many other countries and this type of order spread all over the world. In many new African nations this type of decoration was instituted, probably because they were so different from the Orders of Knighthood of the former colonial masters.

Having abolished the orders of the Czar, the first order of the Soviet Union,  called the "Order of the Red Banner", was founded on 16 September 1918. World War II would see the addition of several more military and civil orders and a few more were added in the 1970s.

Yugoslavia always chose to follow its own policy in creating decorations. Poland and Czechoslovakia stuck to elements of the traditional orders like grand-crosses, commanders and knights but countries like Angola, occupied Afghanistan and North Korea dutifully copied all the models and names of Soviet decorations.

After the collapse of the Soviet Union, the Russian Federation, the newly independent former Soviet republics, and many of the former socialist nations of eastern Europe established their own state orders, some of which are a continuance, revival, or model of orders pre-dating the Communist era.

See also
Orders of the Soviet Union
Orders of Soviet Republics
Orders of the People's Republic of Bulgaria (showing what the orders of one country in the Eastern Bloc were)
Orders of China
Orders of Cuba
Orders of East Germany
Orders of North Korea
Orders of Vietnam
Orders of the Socialist Federal Republic of Yugoslavia
Order of merit

References

Literature 
 Václav Měřička, The book of orders and decorations, London: Hamlyn 1975.   
 Paul Hieronymussen, Europaeiske ordner i farver, Kopenhagen 1967
 Paul Hieronymussen, Orders, medals and decorations of Britain and Europe in colour London: Blandford Press, 1967.

Leninism
Civil awards and decorations of the Soviet Union
Orders of merit